Farzad Tarash (born 1 October 1986) is a freestyle wrestler from Australia.

An engineer from Melbourne, he was Australia's only competitor in the wrestling competition at the 2012 Summer Olympics.  He competed in the 60 kg division after winning a silver medal at the African & Oceania Qualification Tournament in Morocco in March 2012.

He has been the Australian champion each year since 2005.

References

External links
London 2012 profile 
 

1986 births
Living people
Olympic wrestlers of Australia
Australian male sport wrestlers
Wrestlers at the 2012 Summer Olympics
Wrestlers at the 2010 Commonwealth Games
Sportspeople from Melbourne
Olympic competitors from Iran who represented other countries
Australian people of Iranian descent
Iranian expatriate sportspeople in Australia
Commonwealth Games competitors for Australia